SMIL Timesheets is a style sheet language which is intended for use as an external timing stylesheet for the Synchronized Multimedia Integration Language (SMIL), and is meant to separate the timing and presentation from the content inside the markup of another language (for instance, an SMIL Timesheet can be used to time an SMIL-enabled slideshow).

SMIL Timesheets 1.0 was released as a W3C Working Draft on 10 January 2008, with editors from members of the SYMM Working Group (under the W3C Synchronized Multimedia Activity committee). On 29 March 2012, SMIL Timesheets 1.0 was moved out of the draft stage and was published. However, due to the lack of SMIL adoption, other alternatives have been implemented, including the use of CSS Animations to externally time and animate HTML pages into interactive slideshows.

References 

Stylesheet languages
Computer-related introductions in 2008